GC2, GC-II, or variant may refer to:

 Autopista GC-2, a highway in Gran Canaria
 NGC 7, a.k.a. GC 2, a spiral galaxy in Sculptor Constellation
 Second Geneva Convention, a.k.a. GCII, one of the Geneva Conventions
 Groupe de Chasse II (GC II), a fighter group of the French Air Force, see Groupe de Chasse
 Galactic Civilizations II: Dread Lords, a turn-based strategy game
 Ground Control II: Operation Exodus, a real-time tactics game